Defending champions Daphne Akhurst and Sylvia Harper defeated Esna Boyd and Kathleen Le Messurier 6–4, 6–3 in the final, to win the women's doubles tennis title at the 1925 Australasian Championships.

With this win Akhurst completed her first Triple Crown achievement, having already won the singles and the mixed doubles titles earlier that day.

Seeds

  Daphne Akhurst /  Sylvia Harper (champions)
  Esna Boyd /  Kathleen Le Messurier (final)
  Marjorie Cox /  Floris St. George (semifinals)
  Pattie Meaney /  Millie Mitchell (semifinals)

Draw

Finals

Earlier rounds

Section 1

Section 2

Notes

 Even the day before, this encounter was being announced as Akhurst and Harper vs. Weston and partner – so, logically, it had to be the first match of the tournament for Butcherine/Weston pair.

References

External links
 Source for seedings
 Source for the draw

1925 in Australian tennis
1925 in women's tennis
1925 in Australian women's sport